German submarine U-266 was a Type VIIC U-boat of Nazi Germany's Kriegsmarine during World War II. The submarine was laid down on 1 August 1941 at Bremer-Vulkan-Vegesacker Werft in Bremen as yard number 31. She was launched on 11 May 1942 and commissioned on 24 June under the command of Oberleutnant zur See Hannes Leinemann.

She was a member of five wolfpacks.

She was sunk on 15 May 1943 in mid-Atlantic by a British aircraft.

Design
German Type VIIC submarines were preceded by the shorter Type VIIB submarines. U-266 had a displacement of  when at the surface and  while submerged. She had two shafts and two  propellers.

U-266 was fitted with five  torpedo tubes (four fitted at the bow and one at the stern), fourteen torpedoes, one  SK C/35 naval gun, 220 rounds, and two twin  C/30 anti-aircraft guns. The boat had a complement of between forty-four and sixty.

Service history
After training with the 8th U-boat Flotilla, the boat became operational on 1 January 1943 when she was transferred to the 7th flotilla.

First patrol
U-266s first patrol began when she departed Kiel on 22 December 1942. She entered the Atlantic Ocean after negotiating the gap between Iceland and the Faroe Islands. She sank Polyktor on 6 February 1943. She then docked at the French Atlantic port of St. Nazaire on the 17th.

Second patrol and loss
The boat departed St. Nazaire on 14 March 1943 for the mid-Atlantic once more. On 5 May, she sank Bonde, Gharinda and Selvistan.

The boat was sunk on 15 May by a British Handley Page Halifax of No. 58 Squadron RAF. Forty-seven men died; there were no survivors.

Previously recorded fate
U-266 had been thought to have been sunk on 14 May 1943 by a British B-24 Liberator of 86 squadron.

Wolfpacks
U-266 took part in five wolfpacks, namely:
 Jaguar (10 – 27 January 1943) 
 Pfeil (4 – 9 February 1943) 
 Amsel (22 April – 3 May 1943) 
 Amsel 2 (3 – 6 May 1943) 
 Elbe (7 May 1943)

Summary of raiding history

References

Bibliography

External links

World War II submarines of Germany
German Type VIIC submarines
U-boats commissioned in 1942
1942 ships
Ships built in Bremen (state)
U-boats sunk by British aircraft
Ships lost with all hands
World War II shipwrecks in the Atlantic Ocean
U-boats sunk in 1943
Maritime incidents in May 1943